Janis Sirelpuu (born 14 August 1977, in Rakvere) is a former Estonian volleyball player and a volleyball coach. He was a member of the Estonian national team from 1998 to 2011 and represented his country at the 2009 and 2011 Men's European Volleyball Championships.

Sirelpuu started his professional career in hometown club Rivaal Rakvere and has played in various Estonian clubs during his career. He has also played two seasons in Belgium. After retirement from active playing in 2013 Sirelpuu became the head coach of his last team TTÜ (now rebranded as TalTech).

Sporting achievements

References

External links
 Profile on TalTech official site

1977 births
Living people
Sportspeople from Rakvere
Estonian men's volleyball players
Estonian expatriate volleyball players
Estonian expatriate sportspeople in Belgium
Expatriate volleyball players in Belgium
Volleyball coaches